Sulthan Batheri Diocese is one of the 30 dioceses of the Malankara Orthodox Syrian Church. The diocese was created in 1986.  Abraham Ephipanios is the Metropolitan of the diocese. The head office is located in Nirmalagiri Aramana, Poomala, Sulthan Bathery, Wayanad

History

This diocese was formed in 1986 by organizing churches in Wayand, Kannur and Nilagiri district. It was formerly the part of Malabar Diocese.  In the beginning, the diocese was directly under the control of Baselios Marthoma Mathews. Mathai Nooranal became the administrator. In 1991 Kuriakose Clemis became the  metropolitan of Diocese. The Headquarters of the dioceses is situated near Kozhikodu-  Mysore national Highway. It is 300 m away from Sulthan Bathery town. In 2009, Abraham Ephipanios became the metropolitan. , there are 48 churches under the Diocese.

References

External links
Website of Malankara Orthodox Church

Malankara Orthodox Syrian Church dioceses
1986 establishments in Kerala